Carlota Ciganda Machiñena (born 1 June 1990) is a professional golfer from Spain who plays on the Ladies European Tour and the LPGA Tour. She won the LET's Order of Merit (money title) in her debut season in 2012, and was also named Player of the Year and Rookie of the Year.

Early life and college career
Born in Pamplona, Spain, Ciganda started to play golf aged five, influenced by her father. Her uncle is the former football player and coach José Ángel Ziganda. She attended college in the United States at Arizona State University from 2008 to 2011, where she majored in Business Administration. Ciganda speaks four languages.

Amateur career
Ciganda enjoyed a successful amateur career, winning the British Ladies Amateur in 2007. She returned to the finals in 2009, but was runner-up to compatriot and ASU teammate Azahara Muñoz. Ciganda won the European Ladies Amateur Championship in 2004 and 2008, and was the Spanish National age group champion from 2000 to 2006. She was a member of Spain's 2006 and 2008 Espirito Santo Trophy teams, finishing second in 2008; 2005 and 2007 European Junior Solheim Cup teams and 2004 and 2006 European Junior Ryder Cup teams. While at Arizona State, she was a member of the Sun Devils' NCAA championship team in 2009 as a freshman, and made conference history as the first to win consecutive Pac-10 Championships in 2009 and 2010; she finished third in 2011.

Ciganda played in a number of professional tournaments as an amateur and first took part in the 2005 Tenerife Ladies Open at age 14. Although on that occasion she did not make the cut, she finished as the best Spanish representative in several professional tournaments, including the 2007 Open De España Femenino, when she finished eighth and the 2008 Tenerife Ladies Open when she was third, three shots behind the winner, Rebecca Hudson.

Professional career
Ciganda turned professional in May 2011 making her debut the following month at the Tenerife Ladies Match Play, an unofficial event on the LET schedule, where she finished second to Becky Brewerton. She competed on the Ladies European Tour Access Series that season, winning the Murcia Ladies Open. In the LPGA Final Qualifying Tournament in December 2011 she finished tied 34th, earning Priority List Category 20 for the 2012 LPGA Tour season and went on to finish third at the LET Final Qualifying School tournament later that month to earn full playing rights for the 2012 Ladies European Tour season.

In her first full season on the 2012 Ladies European Tour, Ciganda won the ISPS Handa Order of Merit and was also named Players' Player of the Year, as voted for by the LET members. She played in 19 tournaments, with two victories at the Deloitte Ladies Open and the China Suzhou Taihu Open and had ten additional top-10s finishes. Her efforts won her the LET Rookie of the Year award and she ended the season ranked second on the European Solheim Cup points list with total earnings of €251,289.95.

Ciganda was the ladies' winner of the 2019 AON Risk Reward Challenge, collecting the $1,000,000 prize.

Amateur wins
2004 European Ladies Amateur Championship
2005 Spanish International Ladies Amateur Championship
2006 Spanish International Ladies Amateur Championship
2007 British Ladies Amateur
2008 European Ladies Amateur Championship, Portuguese International Ladies Amateur Championship, French International Ladies Amateur Championship

Professional wins (8)

LPGA Tour wins (2)

Co-sanctioned by the LPGA of Korea Tour.

LPGA Tour playoff record (1–2)

Ladies European Tour (6)

LET playoff record (1–1)

LET Access Series (1)
2011 (1) Murcia Ladies Open

Results in LPGA majors
Results not in chronological order before 2019 or in 2020.

^ The Evian Championship was added as a major in 2013

CUT = missed the half-way cut
NT = no tournament
T = tied

Summary

Most consecutive cuts made – 12 (2018 US Open – 2020 PGA)
Longest streak of top-10s – 2 (2019 Evian – 2019 British Open)

Professional career summary

LPGA Tour

 official as of 2022 season

Ladies European Tour

 official as of 2018 season

World ranking
Position in Women's World Golf Rankings at the end of each calendar year.

Team appearances
Amateur

European Lady Junior's Team Championship (representing Spain): 2004 (winners),  2005
European Girls' Team Championship (representing Spain): 2005
Espirito Santo Trophy (representing Spain): 2006, 2008, 2010
Junior Solheim Cup (representing Europe): 2005, 2007 (winners)
Junior Ryder Cup (representing Europe): 2004 (winners), 2006 (tie, Cup retained)
European Ladies' Team Championship (representing Spain): 2007 (winners), 2008, 2009, 2010

Professional
Solheim Cup (representing Europe): 2013 (winners), 2015, 2017, 2019 (winners), 2021 (winners)
International Crown (representing Spain): 2014 (winners)

Solheim Cup record

References

External links

Arizona State University Athletics – Carlota Ciganda

Spanish female golfers
Ladies European Tour golfers
LPGA Tour golfers
Winners of ladies' major amateur golf championships
Solheim Cup competitors for Europe
Olympic golfers of Spain
Golfers at the 2016 Summer Olympics
Golfers at the 2020 Summer Olympics
Mediterranean Games medalists in golf
Mediterranean Games gold medalists for Spain
Mediterranean Games silver medalists for Spain
Competitors at the 2009 Mediterranean Games
Sportspeople from Pamplona
1990 births
Living people
20th-century Spanish women
21st-century Spanish women